Scott Lewis may refer to:

Scott Lewis (left-handed pitcher) (born 1983), American baseball pitcher, 2008–2009
Scott Lewis (right-handed pitcher) (born 1965), American baseball pitcher, 1990–1994
Scott Lewis (politician) (born 1961), American politician
Scott Lewis, vocalist for Carnifex
Scott Lewis, CEO and Editor in Chief of Voice of San Diego
Scott R. Lewis, American sound engineer

See also

Lewis Scott (disambiguation)
Lewis (surname)